Abbeville High School is a public high school for grades 9–12 located in Abbeville, Louisiana, United States and is operated by the Vermilion Parish School Board.

Athletics
Abbeville High athletics competes in the LHSAA.

References

External links
 
 

Public high schools in Louisiana
Schools in Vermilion Parish, Louisiana